Donald Walsh was an American professional basketball player. He played in the National Basketball League for the Kankakee Gallagher Trojans in four games during the 1937–38 season and averaged 1.0 point per game.

References 

Year of birth uncertain
Year of death uncertain
American men's basketball players
Basketball players from Illinois
Forwards (basketball)
Kankakee Gallagher Trojans players